Vittorio De Sica (7 July 1901 – 13 November 1974) was an Italian film director and actor, a leading figure in the neorealist movement.

Four of the films he directed won Academy Awards: Sciuscià and Bicycle Thieves (honorary), while Yesterday, Today and Tomorrow and Il giardino dei Finzi Contini won the Academy Award for Best Foreign Language Film. Indeed, the great critical success of Sciuscià (the first foreign film to be so recognized by the Academy of Motion Picture Arts and Sciences) and Bicycle Thieves helped establish the permanent Best Foreign Film Award. These two films are considered part of the canon of classic cinema. Bicycle Thieves was deemed the greatest film of all time by Sight & Sound magazine's poll of filmmakers and critics in 1958, and was cited by Turner Classic Movies as one of the 15 most influential films in cinema history.

De Sica was also nominated for the 1957 Oscar for Best Supporting Actor for playing Major Rinaldi in American director Charles Vidor's 1957 adaptation of Ernest Hemingway's A Farewell to Arms, a movie that was panned by critics and proved a box office flop. De Sica's acting was considered the highlight of the film.

Life and career

He was born on 7 July 1901 in Sora, Lazio, the son of Neapolitan parents. His father was an officer of the Bank of Italy, and was transferred from Naples to Sora, Italy. De Sica began his career as a theatre actor in the early 1920s and joined Tatiana Pavlova's theatre company in 1923. In 1933 he founded his own company with his wife Giuditta Rissone and Sergio Tofano. The company performed mostly light comedies, but they also staged plays by Beaumarchais and worked with famous directors like Luchino Visconti.

His meeting with the screenwriter Cesare Zavattini was a very important event: together they created some of the most celebrated films of the neorealistic age, like Sciuscià (Shoeshine) and Bicycle Thieves (released as The Bicycle Thief in America), both of which De Sica directed.

De Sica appeared in the British television series The Four Just Men (1959).

Personal life
His passion for gambling was well known and because of it, he often lost large sums of money and accepted work that might not otherwise have interested him. He never kept his gambling a secret from anyone; in fact, he projected it on characters in his own movies, like Count Max (which he acted in but did not direct) and The Gold of Naples, as well as in General Della Rovere, a film directed by Rossellini in which De Sica played the title role.

In 1937 Vittorio De Sica married the actress Giuditta Rissone, who gave birth to their daughter, Emilia (Emi). In 1942, on the set of Un garibaldino al convento, he met Spanish actress María Mercader (cousin of Ramon Mercader, Leon Trotsky's assassin), with whom he started a relationship. After divorcing Rissone in France in 1954, he married Mercader in 1959 in Mexico, but this union was not considered valid under Italian law. In 1968 he obtained French citizenship and married Mercader in Paris. Meanwhile, he had already had two sons with her: Manuel, in 1949, a musician, and Christian, in 1951, who would follow his father's path as an actor and director.

He was a Roman Catholic and a communist. Although divorced, De Sica never parted from his first family. He led a double family life, with double celebrations on holidays. It is said that, at Christmas and on New Year's Eve, he used to put back the clocks by two hours in Mercader's house so that he could make a toast at midnight with both families. His first wife agreed to keep up the facade of a marriage so as not to leave her daughter without a father.

Vittorio De Sica died at 73 after surgery due to lung cancer at the Neuilly-sur-Seine hospital in Paris.

Awards and nominations
Vittorio De Sica was given the Interfilm Grand Prix in 1971 by the Berlin International Film Festival.

 Miracolo a Milano
 Cannes Film Festival Palme d'Or Winner
 Umberto D.
 Cannes Film Festival Official Selection
 Stazione Termini
 Cannes Film Festival Official Selection
 L'oro di Napoli
 Cannes Film Festival Official Selection
 Il Tetto
 Cannes Film Festival OCIC Award Winner
 Anna di Brooklyn
 Berlin International Film Festival Official Selection
 La Ciociara
 Cannes Film Festival Official Selection
 Matrimonio all'italiana
 Moscow International Film Festival Official Selection
 Il Giardino dei Finzi-Contini
 Berlin International Film Festival Golden Bear Winner
 Berlin International Film Festival Interfilm Award Winner – Otto Dibelius Film Award
 Nastro d'Argento for Best Director 1946 for Sciuscià
 Academy Award 1947 Honorary Award to the Italian production for Sciuscià (Shoeshine)
 Academy Award 1949 Special Foreign Language Film Award for Bicycle Thieves
 BAFTA (British Academy Award) 1950 Best film Bicycle Thieves
 Academy Award 1965 Best Foreign Language film for Ieri, oggi, domani (Yesterday, Today and Tomorrow)
 Academy Award 1972 Best Foreign Language film for Il giardino dei Finzi-Contini

Filmography

Filmography as director

Filmography as actor

 Il processo Clemenceau (1917, by Alfredo De Antoni) as Pierre Clémenceau bambino
 La bellezza del mondo (1927, by Mario Almirante)
 La compagnia dei matti (1928, by Mario Almirante) as Prof. Rosolillo
 La vecchia signora (1932, by Amleto Palermi) as Il fine dicitore
 Gli uomini, che mascalzoni! (1932, by Mario Camerini) as Bruno
 Due cuori felici (1932, by Baldassarre Negroni) as Mister Brown
 Paprika (1933, by Carl Boese)
 Pasa el amor (1933, by Adolf Trotz)
 Lisetta (1934, by Carl Boese) as Fritz Peters
 La canzone del sole (1934, by Max Neufeld (he stars too the German version titles Das lied der sonne)) as Dr. Giuseppe Paladino
 Un cattivo soggetto (1933, by Carlo Ludovico Bragaglia) as Willy
 La segretaria per tutti (1933, by Amleto Palermi) as Un gagà
 Tempo massimo (1934, by Mario Mattoli) as Il professore Giacomo Banti
 Il signore desidera? (1934, by Gennaro Righelli) as Martino
 The Song of the Sun (1934, by Max Neufeld) as Paladino, il avvocato
 Darò un milione (1935, by Mario Camerini) as Gold
 Amo te sola (1936, by Mario Mattoli) as Prof. Giovanni Agano
 Non ti conosco più (1936, by Nunzio Malasomma) as Il dottore Alberto Spinelli
 Lohengrin (1936, by Nunzio Malasomma) as Alfredo
 L'uomo che sorride (1937, by Mario Mattoli) as Pio Fardella
 Il signor Max (1937, by Mario Camerini) as Gianni / Max Varaldo
 But It's Nothing Serious (1937, by Mario Camerini) as Memmo Speranza
 Naples of Olden Times (1938, by Amleto Palermi) as Mario Esposito
 La mazurka di papà (1938, by Oreste Biancoli) as Stefano San Mauro / Il figlio di San Mauro
 Il Trionfo dell'amore (1938, by Mario Mattoli) as Vincenzo
 The Cuckoo Clock (1938, by Camillo Mastrocinque) as Il capitano Ducci
 Departure (1938, by Amleto Palermi) as Paolo Veronda
 They've Kidnapped a Man (1938, by Gennaro Righelli) as L'attore cinematografico
 Ai vostri ordini, signora! (1939, by Mario Mattoli) as Pietro Haguet
 Naples That Never Die (1939, by Amleto Palermi)
 Questi ragazzi (1939, by Mario Mattoli) as Vincenzo
 Castles in the Air (1939, by Augusto Genina (He stars too the German version Ins blaue leben)) as Riccardo Pietramola
 Department Store (1939, by Mario Camerini) as Bruno Zacchi
 It Always Ends That Way (1939, by Enrique Telémaco Susini) as Alberto Miller
 Manon Lescaut (1940, by Carmine Gallone) as Renato Des Grieux
 Two on a Vacation (1940, by Carlo Ludovico Bragaglia) as Il conte Corrado Valli
 Red Roses (1940, by Giuseppe Amato and Vittorio De Sica) as Alberto Verani
 The Two Mothers (1940, by Amleto Palermi) as Salvatore
 The Sinner (1940, by Amleto Palermi) as Pietro Bandelli
 Maddalena, Zero for Conduct (1940, by Vittorio De Sica) as Alfredo Hartman
 The Adventuress from the Floor Above (1941, by Raffaello Matarazzo (script too, not credited)) as Fabrizio Marchini
 Teresa Venerdì (1941, by Vittorio De Sica) as Dott. Pietro Vignali
 Se io fossi onesto (1942, by Carlo Ludovico Bragaglia (script too)) as Pietro Kovach
 A Garibaldian in the Convent (1942, by Vittorio De Sica) as Nino Bixio (uncredited)
 La guardia del corpo (1942, by Carlo Ludovico Bragaglia (script too)) as Riccardo, L'investigatore privato
 Non sono superstizioso... ma! (1943, by Carlo Ludovico Bragaglia (script too)) as Il barone Roberto
 I nostri sogni (1943, by Vittorio Cottafavi (script too)) as Leo
 Nessuno torna indietro (1945, by Alessandro Blasetti) as Maurizio
 L'ippocampo (1945, by Gian Paolo Rosmino (script too, and assistant to director, not credited)) as Pio Sandi
 Vivere ancora (1945, by Nino Giannini)
 Lo sbaglio di essere vivo (1945, by Carlo Ludovico Bragaglia) as Adriano Lari
 Roma città libera (1946, by Marcello Pagliero) as Il signore distinto
 Abbasso la ricchezza! (1946, by Gennaro Righelli (story and script too)) as Il conte Ghirani
 Natale al campo 119 (1947, regia di Pietro Francisci (script too and supervision director, not credited)) as Don Vicenzino
 Sperduti nel buio (1947, by Camillo Mastrocinque) as Nunzio
 Lo Sconosciuto di San Marino (1948, by Michal Waszynski and Vittorio Cottafavi) as Leo, l'ateo
 Cuore (1948, by Duilio Coletti (producer and script too)) as Professor Perboni
 Il mondo vuole così (1949, by Giorgio Bianchi) as Paolo Morelli
 Domani è troppo tardi (1949, by Léonide Moguy (consulting director too, not credited)) as Il professor Landi
 Cameriera bella presenza offresi... (1951, by Giorgio Pàstina) as Leonardo Leonardi
 Mamma Mia, What an Impression! (1951, by Roberto Savarese)
 Buongiorno, elefante! (1952, by Gianni Franciolini (producer too)) as Carlo Caretti
 Gli uomini non guardano il cielo (1952, by Umberto Scarpelli)
 In Olden Days (1952, by Alessandro Blasetti) as L'Avvocato Difensore (segment "Il processo di Frine")
 The Earrings of Madame de... (1953, by Max Ophüls) as Baron Fabrizio Donati
 Villa Borghese (1953, by Gianni Franciolini) as L'avvocato Arturo Cavazzuti (segment: Incidente a Villa Borghese)
 Pane, amore e fantasia (1953, by Luigi Comencini) as Maresciallo Carotenuto
 Il matrimonio (1954, by Antonio Petrucci) as Gregory Stefanovich Smirnov
 Cento anni d'amore (1954, by Lionello De Felice) as Duke Giovanni del Bagno aka Signor Pallini (segment "Pendolin")
 Gran Varietà (1954, by Domenico Paolella) as Veneziani - il fine dicitore (segment "Il censore")
 A Slice of Life (1954, by Alessandro Blasetti et Paul Paviot) as Il conte Ferdinando (segment "Don Corradino")
 Il letto (1954, by Gianni Franciolini) as Roberto (segment "Divorce, Le")
 Vergine moderna (1954, by Marcello Pagliero) as Antonio Valli
 Allegro squadrone (1954, by Paolo Moffa) as Il generale
 Pane, amore e gelosia (1954, by Luigi Comencini) as Maresciallo Carotenuto
 L'oro di Napoli (1954, by Vittorio De Sica) as Il conte Prospero B. (segment "I giocatori") (uncredited)
 Peccato che sia una canaglia (1954, by Alessandro Blasetti) as Vittorio Stroppiani
 Il segno di Venere (1955, by Dino Risi) as Alessio Spano
 Gli ultimi cinque minuti (1955, by Giuseppe Amato) as Carlo Reani
 La bella mugnaia (1955, by Mario Camerini) as Don Teofilo - governatore
 Racconti romani (1955, by Gianni Franciolini) as Avvocato Mazzoni Baralla
 Pane, amore e... (1955, by Dino Risi) as Comandante Carotenuto
 Lucky to Be a Woman (1955, by Alessandro Blasetti) as Minor Role (uncredited)
 Il bigamo (1956, by Luciano Emmer) as L'onorevole Principe / Attorney Principe
 I giorni più belli (1956, by Mario Mattoli)
 Mio figlio Nerone (1956, by Steno) as Seneca
 Tempo di villeggiatura (1956, by Antonio Racioppi) as Aristide Rossi
 The Monte Carlo Story (1956, by Samuel Taylor and Giulio Macchi (director's assistant too)) as Count Dino della Fiaba
 Noi siamo le colonne (1956, by Luigi Filippo D'Amico) as Alfredo Celimontani
 Padri e figli (1957, by Mario Monicelli) as Vincenzo Corallo
 I colpevoli (1957, by Turi Vasile) as Giorgio
 Souvenir d'Italie (1957, by Antonio Pietrangeli) as The Count
 Count Max (1957, by Giorgio Bianchi) as Conte Max Orsini Varaldo
 Casinò de Paris (1957, by André Hunebelle) as Alexandre Gordy
 La donna che venne dal mare (1957, by Francesco De Robertis (1957) as Console Bordogin
 Il medico e lo stregone (1957, by Mario Monicelli) as Antonio Locoratolo
 A Farewell to Arms (1957, directed by Charles Vidor (Oscar nomination for Best Supporting Actor) as Major Alessandro Rinaldi
 Vacanze a Ischia (1957, by Mario Camerini) as Ingegner Occhipinti
 Totò, Vittorio e la dottoressa (1957, by Camillo Mastrocinque) as Marchese De Vitti
 Amore e chiacchiere (1958, by Alessandro Blasetti) as Avvocato Bonelli
 Domenica è sempre domenica (1958, by Camillo Mastrocinque) as Comandante Castaldi
 Anna of Brooklyn (1958, by Carlo Lastricati and Vittorio De Sica) as Don Luigi
  (1958, by Wolfgang Staudte) as Il comandante Ernesto De Rossi
 Ballerina e buon Dio (1958, by Antonio Leonviola) as God
 Gli zitelloni (1958, by Giorgio Bianchi) as Il professore
 Pane, amore e Andalusia (1958, by Javier Setó (director's assistant too)) as Maresciallo Carotenuto
 La ragazza di Piazza San Pietro (1958, by Piero Costa) as Armando Conforti
 La prima notte (1959, by Alberto Cavalcanti) as Alfredo
 Il nemico di mia moglie (1959, by Gianni Puccini) as Ottavio Terenzi, padre di Marco
 Uomini e nobiluomini (1959, by Giorgio Bianchi) as Marchese Nicola Peccori Macinelli di Afragola
 Vacanze d'inverno (1959, by Camillo Mastrocinque) as Maurice
 Il mondo dei miracoli (1959, by Luigi Capuano) as Director Pietro Giordani
 Il moralista (1959, by Giorgio Bianchi) as The O. I. M. P. President
 Il generale della Rovere (1959, by Roberto Rossellini) as Bardone AKA 'Grimaldi'
 Ferdinando I, re di Napoli (1959, by Gianni Franciolini) as Salvatore Caputo
 Nel blu dipinto di blu (1959, by Piero Tellini) as Spartaco
 Policarpo, ufficiale di scrittura (1959, by Mario Soldati)
 Gastone (1960, by Mario Bonnard) as The prince
 The Angel Wore Red (1960, by Nunnally Johnson and Mario Russo) as Gen. Clave
 Austerlitz (1960, by Abel Gance) as Pope Pius VII
 It Started in Naples (1960, by Melville Shavelson) as Mario Vitale
 Le tre eccetera del colonnello (1960, by Claude Boissol) as Colonel Belalcazar
 Le pillole di Ercole (1960, by Luciano Salce) as Piero Cuocolo
 The Millionairess (1960, by Anthony Asquith) as Joe
 Il vigile (1960, by Luigi Zampa) as Il sindaco
 Un amore a Roma (1960, by Dino Risi) as Director
 Gli attendenti (1961, by Giorgio Bianchi) as Attore di Fumetti
 L'onorata società (1961, by Riccardo Pazzaglia) as Salvatore, the 'Capintesta'
 Vive Henri IV, vive l'amour (1961, by Claude Autant-Lara) as L'ambassadeur d'Espagne
 The Last Judgment (1961, director) as Defense lawyer
 The Wonders of Aladdin (1961, by Mario Bava and Henry Levin) as Genie
 Gli incensurati (1961, by Francesco Giaculli) as Colonnello Filippo Bitossi
 I due marescialli (1961, by Sergio Corbucci) as Maresciallo Vittorio Cottone
 La Fayette (1962, by Jean Dréville) as Bancroft
 Eva (1962, by Joseph Losey and Guidarino Guidi) (uncredited)
 The Amorous Adventures of Moll Flanders (1965, by Terence Young) as The Count
 Io, io, io... e gli altri (1966, by Alessandro Blasetti) as Commendator Trepossi
 Un italiano in America (1967, by Alberto Sordi) as Giuseppe's Father
 After the Fox (1966, director) as Himself (uncredited)
 Gli altri, gli altri e noi (1967, by Maurizio Arena)
 The Biggest Bundle of Them All (1968, by Ken Annakin) as Cesare Celli
 Darling Caroline (1968, by Denys de la Patellière) as Le comte de Bièvre - le père de Caroline
 The Shoes of the Fisherman (1968, by Michael Anderson) as Cardinal Rinaldi
 If It's Tuesday, This Must Be Belgium (1969, by Mel Stuart) as Shoemaker
 The Thirteen Chairs (1969, by Nicolas Gessner and Luciano Lucignani) as Carlo De Seta - The Commendatore
 Cose di Cosa Nostra (1970, by Steno) as Don Michele
 Io non-vedo, tu non-parli, lui non-sente (1971, by Mario Camerini) as Player in Venice casino
 Trastevere (1971, by Fausto Tozzi) as Enrico Formichi
 Siamo tutti in libertà provvisoria (1972, by Manlio Scarpelli) as Giuseppe Mancini 'Pulcinella'
 Ettore lo fusto (1972, by Enzo G. Castellari) as Giove
 Snow Job (1972, by George Englund) as Enrico Dolphi
 L'odeur des fauves (1972, by Richard Balducci) as Milord
 Le avventure di Pinocchio (1972, by Luigi Comencini (both Film and TV versions)) as Il giudice
 The Small Miracle (1973, TV Movie, by Jeannot Szwarc) as Father Damico
 Storia de fratelli e de cortelli (1973, by Mario Amendola) as Maresciallo Cenciarelli
 Il delitto Matteotti (1973, by Florestano Vancini) as Mauro Del Giudice
 Viaggia, ragazza, viaggia, hai la musica nelle vene (1973, by Pasquale Squitieri)
 Blood for Dracula (1974, by Paul Morrissey and Antonio Margheriti) as Il Marchese Di Fiore
 C'eravamo tanto amati (1974, by Ettore Scola) as Himself
 Intorno (1974, Short, by Manuel De Sica)
 L'eroe (1976, TV Movie, by Manuel De Sica) (final film role)

Note: on many sources, Fontana di Trevi by Carlo Campogalliani (1960) and La bonne soupe by Robert Thomas (1964) are included but de Sica does not appear in those films.

Television appearances as actor
 The Four Just Men, by Sapphire Films (1959) (10 of the 39 episodes made)

References

Further reading

External links

 
 Vittorio De Sica director bio for The Garden of the Finzi-Continis Sony Pictures Entertainment website, retrieved 8 April 2006
 Vittorio De Sica Review Wall Street Journal article, retrieved 9 March 2013

1901 births
1974 deaths
People of Campanian descent
Italian Roman Catholics
Italian comedians
Italian communists
Italian male film actors
Italian film directors
Italian male silent film actors
People from Sora, Lazio
David di Donatello winners
Nastro d'Argento winners
20th-century Italian male actors
Italian-language film directors
Christian communists
Directors of Best Foreign Language Film Academy Award winners
Directors of Palme d'Or winners
Directors of Golden Bear winners
20th-century Italian comedians